José Antonio Yorba (July 20, 1743 – January 16, 1825), also known as Don José Antonio Yorba I, was a Spanish soldier and early settler of Spanish California.

Spanish soldier
Born in Sant Sadurní d'Anoia (San Saturnino) in Catalonia, Spain, Yorba was one of Fages' original Catalan volunteers. In 1762, during the Seven Years' War, Yorba took part in the Spanish invasion of Portugal. He became a corporal under Gaspar de Portolà during the Spanish expedition of 1769.  He was in San Francisco in 1777; Monterey in 1782; and in San Diego in 1789. In 1797 he was retired as inválido sergeant; and in 1810 was grantee of Rancho Santiago de Santa Ana.

Rancho Santiago de Santa Ana
In 1810, José Antonio Yorba was awarded by the Spanish Empire the  Rancho Santiago de Santa Ana land grant. Covering some 15 Spanish leagues, Yorba's land comprised a significant portion of today's Orange County including where the cities of Olive, Orange, Villa Park, Santa Ana, Tustin, Costa Mesa and Newport Beach stand today.

Upon his death in 1825 he was buried at his request in an unmarked grave in the cemetery at Mission San Juan Capistrano.  A cenotaph was later placed in Yorba's honor.

Descendants
He married his first wife, Maria Garcia Feliz, in 1773.  After her death, he married Maria Josefa Grijalva, daughter of Juan Pablo Grijalva, in 1782.

Throughout the American and Mormon migration period, descendants of the Yorbas continued to marry into other prominent Spanish families, including the Cota, Grijalvas, Perralta, and Dominguez families. Many of today's recognizable American names in the Southern California area, including the Kraemers and Irvines, also married into these Spanish families. In the early twentieth century, Samuel Kraemer, who had married the last of the "grand" Yorbas, Angelina Yorba, tore down the historic Yorba Hacienda after the city of Yorba Linda refused to accept it as a donation.

The legacy of the Yorba family can be appreciated at the historic Yorba Cemetery, established in 1858, and currently surrounded by Woodgate Park.

Notes

References

Bancroft, Hubert Howe (1882). The Works of Hubert Howe Bancroft. San Francisco: A.L. Bancroft & Co. 
Beers, Henry Putney, (1979). "Spanish & Mexican Records of the American Southwest : A Bibliographical Guide to Archive and Manuscript Sources", Tucson : University of Arizona Press
Dominguez, Arnold O., (1985). "José Antonio Yorba I", 2nd Ed., Orange County Historical Society
Pleasants, Adelene (1931). "History of Orange County, California. Vol. 1", Los Angeles, CA : J. R. Finnell & Sons Publishing Company
Mildred Yorba MacArthur, A brief history of the Yorba family, Yorba Linda Public Library, May 1960.
Newmark, Haris (1916) Sixty Years in Southern California: 1853-1913, Knickerbocker Press, New York.

See also
Cristobal Aguilar, last Hispanic mayor of Los Angeles until Antonio Villaraigosa, married Maria Dolores Yorba
Californios

1743 births
1825 deaths
Mexican people of Catalan descent
Mexican people of Spanish descent
American landowners
California pioneers
People from Alt Penedès